Ratna Asmara (1913 – August 1968) was an Indonesian actress and film director. Originally active in theatre, in 1940 she starred in the romance film Kartinah, which her first husband Andjar directed.

After appearing in several further films, she made her directorial debut in 1950 with Sedap Malam (Sweetness of the Night), which made her the first female film director in Indonesian history. Although her work was generally ignored, later female Indonesian directors have found critical acclaim.

Early career 
Ratna was born in the Minangkabau Highlands of Sumatra  1913. This ethnic Sundanese actress had a sister, Suhara, who was married to the director Bachtiar Effendi.

Ratna and her husband Andjar joined the Dardanella touring troupe in the early 1930s; with the troupe she was known for the quality of her voice. In the late 1930s she joined Andjar with his Bollero troupe and became its star. She also acted for the Royal Balinese Dancers.

When Andjar was asked by The Teng Chun to direct a film for The's company Java Industrial Film (JIF), Ratna came with him. The couple earned 1,000 gulden each for their role in the resulting film, Kartinah (1940), Andjar as director and Ratna as its star. The film, a love story between the nurse Kartinah (played by Ratna) and her commander, was also the first war film in the country, taking place within the Air Raid Preparation teams.

Ratna also appeared in Andjar's later directorial work, Noesa Penida (a love story set in Bali) and in Ratna Moetoe Manikam, a story about a love triangle between two goddesses and a mortal man. During the National Revolution following Indonesia's independence, Ratna appeared in one further film: Andjar's 1948 Djaoeh Dimata (Out of Sight).

Directing 
In 1950, Ratna was commissioned by Djamaluddin Malik to direct the film Sedap Malam (Sweetness of the Night) for Malik's company Persari; Malik produced. Andjar wrote the screenplay. This made her the first female film director in the country. This was followed by two further films for the ethnic Chinese-owned Djakarta Film, both of which Andjar wrote: Musim Bunga di Selabintana (Spring in Selabintana) in 1951 and Dr Samsi in 1952.

In 1953, Ratna established Ratna Films, which had a single production, Nelajan (The Fishermen), before being rebranded Asmara Films. This new company produced Dewi dan Pemilihan Umum (Dewi and the Election) in 1954, with Ratna as director; this coincided with the first legislative elections in 1955.

Ratna left Indonesia for Italy to study film in 1954. She died at her residence in Jakarta, in August 1968.

Legacy 
After Ratna, only five female directors appeared in Indonesian cinema until near the end of the 20th century: Roostijati, Citra Dewi, Sofia W.D., Ida Farida, and Rima Melati. These directors rarely, if ever, received the same recognition as their male counterparts; acting remained the only way for a woman in the industry to gain recognition. Indeed, during her directorial career Ratna received little support from male directors.

After the fall of Suharto in 1998, the number of women directors has increased dramatically, with several of them receiving national and international recognition. The earliest in this generation are Mira Lesmana and Nan Achnas, who collaborated with several other directors in Kuldesak (1999). Further examples include Nia Dinata, who has had two of her films, Ca-bau-kan (2002) and Berbagi Suami (2006) submitted for an Academy Award for Best Foreign Language Film; Ucu Agustin has been described as "one of Indonesia’s top documentary filmmakers" and had her films screened internationally; while Djenar Maesa Ayu's Mereka Bilang, Saya Monyet! (2008) was on several lists of the best films of the year.

Filmography

References 
Footnotes

Bibliography

External links 
 

1913 births
1968 deaths
20th-century deaths
20th-century Indonesian actresses
Actors from West Sumatra
Expatriate actresses in Italy
Indonesian expatriates in Italy
Indonesian film actresses
Indonesian women film directors
Indonesian film directors
Minangkabau
Indonesian stage actresses
Sundanese people